Castelfranco Piandiscò is a commune in the province of Arezzo, Tuscany, central Italy. It was created on 1 January 2014 from the merger of previous comuni of Castelfranco di Sopra and Pian di Scò.

References

Cities and towns in Tuscany
Populated places established in 2014
2014 establishments in Italy